Chaplin is a surname of Russian, Ukrainian and Belarusian origin. Surnames of English and French origin are derived from the occupational name for a clergyman, while Belarusian and Ukrainian uses are derived from chaplya, meaning 'heron' or 'stork'. The surname Chaplin may refer to:

People named Chaplin 
 Alice Chaplin (1848–1921), English artist
 Ben Chaplin (born: Benedict Greenwood 1970), English actor
 Blondie Chaplin (born 1951), South African musician
 Carmen Chaplin (born 1972), actress, granddaughter of Charlie Chaplin
 Charles Chaplin, various including:
 Charlie Chaplin (1889–1977), English comedy film actor - silent and "talkie" - and director
 Charles Chaplin Jr. (1925–1968), American actor, son of comedian Charlie Chaplin
 Charles Chaplin (artist) (1907–1987), English artist, engraver and printmaker
 Charles Chaplin (elder) (1759–1816), British Member of Parliament for Lincolnshire 1802-1816
 Charles Chaplin (younger) (1786–1859), British Member of Parliament for Stamford 1809–1812, and for Lincolnshire 1818–1831
 Charles Joshua Chaplin (1825–1891), French painter
 Charlie Chaplin (singer), Jamaican dancehall and ragga singer
 Christopher Chaplin (born 1962), actor, son of comedian Charlie Chaplin
 Conor Chaplin (born 1997), English footballer
 Dmitry Chaplin (born 1982), Russian-born International Latin dancer
 Geraldine Chaplin (born 1944), American actress, daughter of comedian Charlie Chaplin
 Henry Chaplin, 1st Viscount Chaplin (1840–1923), British politician
 John Chaplin (coach), coach at Washington State University
 John Worthy Chaplin (1840–1920), English recipient of the Victoria Cross
 Josephine Chaplin (born 1949), actress, daughter of comedian Charlie Chaplin
 Judith Chaplin (1939–1993), British politician
 Kate Chaplin (1865–1948), violinist, who with her sisters Nellie Chaplin (1857–1930), pianist, and Mabel Chaplin (1870–1960), cellist, formed the Chaplin Trio
 Kiera Chaplin (born 1982), actress and model, granddaughter of comedian Charlie Chaplin
 Michael Chaplin (actor) (born 1946), actor, son of comedian Charlie Chaplin
 Nikita Chaplin (born 1982), Russian politician
 Oona Chaplin (born 1986), actress, granddaughter of comedian Charlie Chaplin
 Ralph Chaplin (1887–1961), American labor activist
 Saul Chaplin (1912–1997), American composer and musical director
 Shelley Chaplin (born 1984), Australian wheelchair basketball player
 Sid Chaplin (1916–1986), British writer
 Sydney Chaplin (born: Sidney John Hill 1885–1965), elder half-brother of comedian Charlie Chaplin
 Sydney Chaplin (American actor) (1926–2009), American cinema and theatre actor, second son of comedian Charlie Chaplin
 Tom Chaplin (born 1979), lead singer of the English piano rock band, Keane
 Victoria Chaplin (born 1951), actress, daughter of comedian Charlie Chaplin
 Vsevolod Chaplin (1968–2020), Russian Orthodox Church spokesman
 William Chaplin (coach proprietor) (1787–1859), English transport entrepreneur and Member of Parliament for Salisbury (1847–1857)
 William Robert Chaplin, Warden of Trinity House

See also 

Chaplin family, relatives of comedian Charlie Chaplin
Chaplin (disambiguation)
Charlin (name)

References 

English-language surnames
French-language surnames